Nalishkêne (ناڵشکێنه‌) is the nearest mountain to the city of Bukan in West Azarbaijan Province of Iran.

It is in the Zagros Mountains range.

History
It has a symbolic importance in Kurdish literature. Graves of two Kurdish musicians, Hesen Zîrek and Qale Mere, are on this mountain.

Mountains of Iran
Mountains of Kurdistan
Landforms of West Azerbaijan Province
Zagros Mountains